André-Jacques Garnerin (31 January 176918 August 1823) was a French balloonist and the inventor of the frameless parachute. He was appointed Official Aeronaut of France.

Biography
Garnerin was born in Paris. He was captured by British troops during the first phase of the French Revolutionary Wars 1792–1797, turned over to the Austrians and held as a  prisoner of war in Buda in Hungary for three years.

Balloons and parachutes

Ballooning
Garnerin, a student of the ballooning pioneer professor Jacques Charles, was involved with the flight of hot air balloons, and worked with his older brother Jean-Baptiste-Olivier Garnerin (1766–1849) in most of his ballooning activities. Eventually he was appointed Official Aeronaut of France.

Garnerin began experiments with early parachutes based on umbrella-shaped devices and carried out the first frameless parachute descent (in the gondola) with a silk parachute on 22 October 1797 at Parc Monceau, Paris (1st Brumaire, Year VI of the Republican calendar). Garnerin's first parachute was made of white canvas with a diameter of approximately 23 feet (7 m). The umbrella was closed before he ascended, with a pole running down its center and a rope running through a tube in the pole, which connected it to the balloon. Garnerin rode in a basket attached to the bottom of the parachute; at a height of approximately  he severed the rope that connected his parachute to the balloon. The balloon continued skyward while Garnerin, with his basket and parachute, fell. The basket swung violently during descent, then bumped and scraped when it landed, but Garnerin emerged uninjured.

Garnerin went on to stage regular tests and demonstrations at Parc Monceau, Paris, on 22 October 1797, which became a cause célèbre when he announced in 1798 that his next flight would include a woman as a passenger. Although the public and press were in favour, he was forced to appear in front of officials of the Central Bureau of Police to justify his project. They were concerned about the effect that reduced air pressure might have on the organs of the delicate female body and loss of consciousness, plus the moral implications of flying in such close proximity. Unsatisfied with Garnerin's responses, the police issued an injunction against him, forbidding the ascent on the grounds that the young woman was committing herself to the venture without any idea of the possible outcome. After further consultation with both the Minister of the Interior and the Minister of the Police the injunction was overturned on the grounds that "there was no more scandal in seeing two people of different gender ascend in a balloon than it is to see them jump into a carriage." They also agreed that the decision of the woman showed proof of her confidence in the experiment and a degree of personal intrepidity.

Citoyenne Henri had already been chosen, so when the ban was lifted Garnerin was ready to proceed. He advertised the ascent in L'Ami des Lois (a Parisian newspaper published from 1795 to 1798) :

On 8 July 1798 a large number of spectators gathered in the Parc Monceau to witness the ascent. By all accounts Citoyenne Henri was young and beautiful, and she and Garnerin took several turns around the park to the applause of the crowd before she was assisted into the basket of the balloon by the astronomer Jérôme Lalande.

Touring England
André-Jacques held the position of Official Aeronaut of France, so with his wife Jeanne Geneviève he visited England in 1802 during the Peace of Amiens and the couple completed a number of demonstration flights. In the evening of 21 September 1802, André-Jacques ascended in his hydrogen balloon from the Volunteer Ground in North Audley Street, Grosvenor Square and made a parachute descent to a field near St Pancras. This gave rise to the English popular ballad:
Bold Garnerin went up
Which increased his Repute
And came safe to earth
In his Grand Parachute.

He also made his second English balloon ascent with Edward Hawke Locker on 5 July 1802 from Lord's Cricket Ground, travelling the 17 miles (27.4 km) from there to Chingford in just over 15 minutes and carrying a letter of introduction signed by the Prince Regent to give to anyone should he crash land. However, when the war between France and Great Britain resumed they were forced to pack up and return to the continent where, on 3–4 October 1803, he covered a distance of 245 miles (395 km) between Paris and Clausen, Germany, with his balloon.

Family
In most of his ballooning activities Garnerin worked with his older brother Jean-Baptiste-Olivier Garnerin (1766–1849).

Jeanne Garnerin
His student Jeanne Geneviève Labrosse, who later became his wife, was both a balloonist and the first female parachutist. Labrosse first flew on 10 November 1798, one of the earliest women to fly in a balloon, and on 12 October 1799, Labrosse was the first woman to parachute, from an altitude of 900 meters.

Elisa Garnerin
His paternal niece Elisa Garnerin, (born 1791), learned to fly balloons at age 15 and made 39 professional parachute descents from 1815 to 1836 in Italy, Spain, Russia, Germany, and France.

Death
On 18 August, 1823, at the age of 54, Garnerin was working on the construction of a new balloon. While walking around the construction site, he was struck by a falling beam which killed him instantly.

Legacy
Garnerin's first parachute jump was commemorated by Google in a Google Doodle on 22 October 2013.

Notes

References

Other sources
  Searchable at  Internet Archive – A handy book of curious information by William Shepard Walsh
 "World's First Parachute Jump made in 1797". George Galloway essay on Andre-Jacques Garnerin
 M F Wright – profile of Andre Garnerin
 From The Big Umbrella, by John Lucas, Drake Publishers Inc. Great Britain, 1973.
 The Silken Angels, (early 1960s) [author unknown]
 Parachuting, Dan Poynter

External links 

  Brief biography and picture
  Additional information on Garnerin
  André-Jacques Garnerin biography and picture
 

1769 births
1823 deaths
18th-century French inventors
French balloonists
French skydivers
Aviation pioneers
French aviators
French stunt performers
Accidental deaths in France